Vertue is a surname. Notable people with the surname include:

Beryl Vertue (1931–2022), English television producer
George Vertue (1684–1756), English engraver and antiquary
John Vertue (1826–1900), English Roman Catholic prelate
Robert Vertue (died 1506), English architect and mason
Sue Vertue, British television producer
William Vertue (died 1527), English architect

See also
Vertue (yacht), design of yacht named after the Little Ships Club's Vertue Cup
Virtue